Martha Bayles is an American author, critic, and professor. She has written widely on the arts, media, cultural policy, and U.S. public diplomacy.

Bayles's essays and reviews have appeared in many national and international publications, including the New York Times, the International Herald Tribune, Newsweek, Boston Globe, Atlantic Monthly, and The New Republic. She is a former TV and arts critic for the Wall Street Journal and a regular contributor to the Boston Globe, Weekly Standard, and Claremont Review of Books. She is also an educator, having taught at Harvard University, Claremont McKenna College, and Boston College.  She has lectured around the world on public diplomacy and popular culture.  Her books, Hole In Our Soul: The Loss of Beauty and Meaning in American Popular Music, Ain't That a Shame? Censorship and the Culture of Transgression, and, most recently, Through a Screen Darkly: Popular Culture, Public Diplomacy, and America's Image Abroad, have received high praise. Sam Schulman called Bayles "one of the great unsung critics of the baby boom generation." Bayles received her Bachelor of Arts degree from Harvard University and her master's in Education from the University of Pennsylvania.

As of 2018, Bayles teaches humanities at Boston College and lives in Newton, Massachusetts.

Life and career 

Bayles is a native of Boston and a Harvard graduate.

After her undergraduate degree, she taught in various public schools of Philadelphia, Boston, and Cambridge, MA.  From 1997 and 2003, she taught humanities at Claremont McKenna College in Claremont, California.  Since 2003 she has been a lecturer in the Arts & Sciences Honors Program at Boston College, teaching humanities and the Western cultural tradition.

Bayles has been arts and television critic for the Wall Street Journal, arts correspondent for the PBS program, "Religion & Ethics Newsweekly," a visiting scholar at the Getty Institute in Los Angeles, and a (in 2006) a Fulbright Lecturer at Poland’s Marie Curie Sklodowska University, Catholic University, and Warsaw University.

Bayles has lectured widely on American culture, globalized popular culture and news, and US public diplomacy. In the United States, she has spoken at the American Foreign Service Association; the Center for Advanced Cultural Studies at the University of Virginia; George Washington University; the Institute for International Education; the University of Oklahoma; the American Enterprise Institute; the Institute on Culture, Religion, and World Affairs at Boston University; the Cosmos Club in Washington, D.C.: and Humanity in Action. Abroad, she has given two speaking tours in Germany (organized by the U.S. Embassy) and one in Poland (as a Fulbright Senior Scholar). She has also spoken at the Kolegium Artes Liberales at the University of Warsaw; the University of Alberta; the Aspen Institute Berlin; the Women in Memory Forum in Cairo; Koç University in Istanbul; and several universities in China, including Tsinghua University, Beijing Foreign Studies University, Fudan University, and Shanghai Foreign Studies University; as well as at the Hong Kong Forum, Hong Kong Press Club, and University of Hong Kong.

Bayles currently belongs to the Public Diplomacy Council (2008–present), a "nonprofit organization committed to the importance of the academic study, professional practice, and responsible advocacy of public diplomacy."  She has been a member of the Business for Diplomatic Action (2008–2011).

Published work 

Bayles has written three books.  Hole in Our Soul: The Loss of Beauty and Meaning in American Popular Music is a critical look at the disappearing cultural roots in American music that traces the elements of jazz, blues, country, and gospel music through the rise of rock 'n' roll, punk, heavy metal, and rap.  Her argument of "perverse" modernism created much discussion among responding critics.

Ain't That a Shame? Censorship and the Culture of Transgression published by the Institute for US Studies at the University of London, takes a comparative look at censorship in Britain and the United States. Her most recent book, Through a Screen Darkly: Popular Culture, Public Diplomacy, and America's Image Abroad, was published by Yale University Press in 2014. In preparation for the book, she conducted hundreds of interviews in eleven countries across the world, and in it she discusses foreign perceptions of Americans based on our media exports and recommends ways of renewing US public diplomacy to engage with those perceptions.

Besides her own publications, Bayles has contributed a number of book chapters to other popular works, including the chapter on "Popular Culture" in The Oxford Companion to United States History.   Other contributions include:
   "Popular Culture," in Understanding America: The Anatomy of An Exceptional Nation, edited by Peter H. Schuck and James Q. Wilson (Public Affairs, 2008).
 "Exporting the Wrong Picture," in International Relations (Longman, 2006).
 "None So Deaf: Toward a New Pedagogy of Popular Music," in Bridging the Gap: Popular Music and Music Education, edited by Carlos Rodriquez (National Association for Music Education, 2004).
 "We Are All Sopranos," in Annual Editions: Race and Ethnic Relations (McGraw Hill, 2004).
 "Miles Davis and the Double Audience," in Essays on Miles Davis, edited by Gerald Early (Missouri Historical Society, 2001).

Bayles is a regular contributor to Wall Street Journal, Boston Globe, and Weekly Standard.  She occasionally contributes to Wilson Quarterly, New York Times, and Washington Post.

Bayles has maintained a few blogs as well: "Hearts and Minds," a blog on culture and foreign affairs in World Affairs; "Serious Popcorn," a film blog for ArtsJournal.com; and "Television," a weekly column in the Wall Street Journal (1983–1990).

Reviews and reception

For Through a Screen Darkly 
 Summary provided by Yale University Press: http://yalepress.yale.edu/yupbooks/excerpts/Bayles_excerpt.pdf
 Hague Journal of Diplomacy
 Claremont Review of Books
 National Review Online
 Weekly Standard, Feb. 17, 2014 – Sam Schulman: http://www.weeklystandard.com/articles/picture-america_778803.html?page=1
 American Diplomacy, May 2014 – Donald Bishop: http://www.unc.edu/depts/diplomat/item/2014/0105/bk/book05_bishop_fun.html
 Commentary, April 1, 2014 – Sonny Bunch: https://www.commentarymagazine.com/article/how-they-see-us/
 Books and Culture, May 2014 – Sarah Ruden
 First Things, April 2014 – Roger Scruton 
 USC-Annenberg, CPD Blog, May 23, 2014 – Metzgar
 Chronicle of Higher Education – Miller (and MB Response)
 Harvard Magazine

For A Hole in Our Soul 
 New York Times, review by Edward Rothstein, July 3, 1994 
 New York Times, review by Christopher Lehmann-Haupt, July 25, 1994 
 New York Times, review by Jon Pareles, August 14, 1994 
 Publishers Weekly, review: http://www.publishersweekly.com/978-0-02-901962-7
 London Times, lead editorial and review by Clive Davis, July 20, 1994
 New Republic, review by Alexander Star, May 2, 1994
 US News and Universal Press Syndicate, review by John Leo, May 24, 1994
 National Review, review by Mark Cunningham, May 16, 1994
 American Spectator, review by M.D. Carnegie, June 1994
 New Criterion, review by Mark Steyn, June 1994
 Sojourners, review by Mark Gavreau Judge, September–October 1994
 Commentary, review by Daniel J. Silver, August 1994
 American Record Guide, review by Vroon, November–December 1996
 Prospect (UK), review by Tony Parsons, August–September 1996: http://www.prospectmagazine.co.uk/magazine/raparoundtheclock/#.U7xn7ajld2c
 The World & I, review by Eric Olsen, May 1994: http://www.worldandischool.com/public/1994/May/school-resource12240.asp\

Media 

Bayles has appeared on multiple television and radio programs to discuss her work including PBS NewsHour, OnPoint with Tom Ashbrook, the "Kojo Nnambi Show", the "Dennis Prager Show", "Midday with Dan Rodericks", The Public Diplomat, and the American Enterprise Institute.

Most recently she has promoted her work and foreign policy on C-Span's "Washington Journal" with John McArdle, "Greater Boston" with Jared Bowen on WGBH Boston, and "Newshour" with Jeffrey Brown on PBS (WETA, Washington).

Awards and honors 

Bayles has been awarded numerous honors from a variety of cultural, academic, and national institutions, including:
 Arthur L. Andrews Award for Fiction, Cornell University (1976)
 American Academy of Poets Honorable Mention, Cornell University (1976)
 American Academy of Poets Award, Syracuse University (1975)
 Joan Grey Untermeyer Award for Poetry, Radcliffe College (1969, 1970)
 American Academy of Poets Honorable Mention, Harvard University (1969)

Articles 
 "Kick the Chicken, Kowtow to the Monkey," American Interest (December 26, 2014)
 "Horrible Bosses," American Interest, (December 12, 2014)
 "Bowe Bergdahl,'Homeland,' and the Kindness of Strangers," Boston Globe
 "Subdued by the Tube," Boston Globe (January 20, 2013).
 “The Marketing of a Global Blockbuster,” Boston Globe (January 2, 2010)
 "Paint By Numbers: New Deal Art and the Problems of Public Patronage," Weekly Standard (November 16, 2009).
 "Both a Dream and a Nightmare," Wall Street Journal (August 14, 2009).
 “When the Revolution Isn’t Broadcast,” Boston Globe (June 28, 2009) [reprinted in International Herald Tribune].
 “The Legacy of Michael Jackson,” Radio Free Europe/Radio Liberty website (June 27, 2009).
 "The Return of Cultural Diplomacy," Newsweek "Special Edition: Issues 2009" (December 2008 – February 2009).
 “The Art of Global Public Relations,” Wall Street Journal (July 24, 2008).
 “Strangers in a Foreign Land,” Wall Street Journal (August 1, 2008).
 “Risky Business for Hollywood,” Boston Globe (May 6, 2008) [reprinted in International Herald Tribune].
 "Public Diplomacy, TV-Style," Wall Street Journal (February 16, 2007).
 “The Angel of Diversity,” [memoir], Antioch Review (fall 2006).
 “Innocents Abroad,” Wall Street Journal (May 5, 2006).
 "Rah! Rah! Dada!", Weekly Standard (May 1, 2006).
 "Elizabeth in Love," New York Sun (April 18, 2006).
 "Crossing the Rubicon," Claremont Review of Books (Spring 2006).
 "Now Showing: The Good, the Bad and the Ugly Americans," Washington Post Outlook (August 28, 2005).
 "Goodwill Hunting," Wilson Quarterly (Summer 2005).
 "Some of Rap’s Fathers Start Taking Responsibility," Wall Street Journal (July 6, 2005).
 "Attacks on Rap Now Come from Within," Wall Street Journal (April 28, 2005).
 "The Strange Career of Folk Music," Michigan Quarterly Review (Spring 2005).
 Anti-Snobs and Anti-Artists: Toward a Democratic Aesthetic," Society (March–April 2004).
 "We Are All Sopranos," Chronicle of Higher Education (6 December 2002).
 "Cultural Aftershocks: Closing the Curtain on ‘Perverse Modernism’," Chronicle of Higher Education (October 26, 2001).
 "The Decline of America's Image Abroad," Aus Politik und Zeitgesichte

References

External links

Articles 
 A collection of Bayles' articles published by the Claremont Review of Books concerning film and television: http://claremont.org/search_all.php?search=martha+bayles&sh=Search

Lectures, blogs, and online interviews
 "Serious Popcorn," a movie blog maintained by Bayles from 2004–2011: http://www.artsjournal.com/popcorn/
 Tolson blog at Hedgehog Review
 Lecture at the Institute for Advanced Studies in Culture, University of Virginia, March 5, 2014
 Interview on Public Diplomacy website
 Lecture at American Enterprise Institute, March 18, 2013
 Interview with London Times music critic Clive Davis: http://clivedavis.blogs.com/clive/2005/08/transatlantic_v_1.html
 Interview at jerryjazzmusician.com,  April 7, 2001: http://www.jerryjazzmusician.com/2001/04/jazz-critic-martha-bayles-on-modern-music/
 Roundtable at jerryjazzmusician.com with Stanley Crouch and Loren Schoenberg, May 4, 2003: http://www.jerryjazzmusician.com/2003/05/blues-for-clement-greenberg-a-jerry-jazz-musician-roundtable-hosted-roundtable-on-jazz-criticism-with-stanley-crouch-martha-bayles-and-loren-schoenberg/
 

American women writers
Modernism (music)
1948 births
Living people
Writers from Boston
Boston College faculty
Harvard University alumni
American women academics
21st-century American women